Pablo Bennevendo Peña (born 3 January 2000) is a Mexican professional footballer who plays as a full-back for Liga MX club UNAM.

Career statistics

Club

References

External links
 
 
 

Living people
2000 births
Association football defenders
Club Universidad Nacional footballers
Liga de Expansión MX players
Liga MX players
Footballers from Mexico City
Mexican footballers